Bhupathi is a 2007 Kannada action thriller film directed and written by S. Govinda. The film stars Darshan and Sherin whilst K. S. Ashwath and Sumalatha play other pivotal roles.

The film featured an original score and soundtrack composed by V. Harikrishna.

Cast 
 Darshan as Bhupathi
 Sherin as Aisiri
 Sumalatha 
 K. S. Ashwath
 Mukesh Rishi as Aravind Ram
 Jayasudha

Soundtrack 
The music was composed by V. Harikrishna.

Release

Critical reception

Sify rated the film 3/5 and noted "Harikrishna the hot sensation of Kannada music has delivered hits in two among five songs and the background score is impressive. Cinematography in the interiors is not taken care very well. On the whole, a not-to-miss film for Darshan fans". B S Srivani, reviewing for Deccan Herald , says "Watching veteran actor Ashwath is heartwarming as you witness the effort put in by this stalwart in delivering each dialogue the correct way. Sumalatha exudes calm dignity to her brief role. One wonders why Mukesh Rishi was summoned to do a poorly etched CM’s role. Shireen is there to provide the oomph. Darshan fans maybe a little disappointed though". R G Vijayasarathy reviewing for Rediff.com  rated the film 2 out of 5 stars, "Bhoopathy is average fare and may appeal only to die hard Darshan fans".

References

External links 
 

2007 films
2000s Kannada-language films
Indian action thriller films
Films scored by V. Harikrishna
2007 action thriller films